New York's 51st State Assembly district is one of the 150 districts in the New York State Assembly. It has been represented by Marcela Mitaynes since 2021, defeating 26-year incumbent Félix Ortiz.

Geography
District 51 is in Brooklyn. The district includes Red Hook, Sunset Park, and northern Bay Ridge.

Recent election results

2022

2020

2018

2016

2014

2012

2010

2008

References

51
Politics of Brooklyn